Martina Hingis was the defending champion, but had to withdraw due to an ankle injury.

Lindsay Davenport won the title by defeating Jelena Dokic 6–3, 6–1 in the final.

Seeds
The top four seeds received a bye into the second round. Martina Hingis, the first seed, dropped out of the tournament. Her bye was given to number nine seed Sandrine Testud.

Draw

Finals

Top half

Bottom half

External links
WTA draws

Zurich Open
Singles